The 2013 Telavi Open was a professional tennis tournament played on outdoor clay courts. It was the sixth edition of the tournament which was part of the 2013 ITF Women's Circuit, offering a total of $50,000 in prize money. It took place in Telavi, Georgia, on 23–29 September 2013.

Singles entrants

Seeds 

 1 Rankings as of 16 September 2013

Other entrants 
The following players received wildcards into the singles main draw:
  Mariam Bolkvadze
  Tamari Chalaganidze
  Ekaterine Gorgodze
  Sofia Kvatsabaia

The following players received entry from the qualifying draw:
  Nastja Kolar
  Laura Pigossi
  Ganna Poznikhirenko
  Ekaterina Yashina

Champions

Singles 

  Alexandra Panova def.  Victoria Kan 7–5, 6–1

Doubles 

  Maria Elena Camerin /  Anja Prislan def.  Anna Zaja /  Maša Zec Peškirič 7–5, 6–2

External links 
 2013 Telavi Open at ITFtennis.com
 Official website

2013 ITF Women's Circuit
2013
2013 in Georgian sport